Radium is a chemical element with symbol Ra and atomic number 88.

Radium may also refer to:

Places 
Radium, Colorado, United States
Radium, Kansas, United States
Radium, Minnesota, United States
Radium, Virginia, United States
Radium Hot Springs, BC
, Canada

Computing
Radium, software for Sirius Satellite Radio
Radium, software for module files
Radium (warez), a software piracy group

Other uses
Radium Futebol Clube, a Brazilian association football club
Radium (horse), an Australian campdrafting horse and sire
Radium (album), an album by Ruoska
FiXT Radium, the Radium label from music company FiXT
Radium Flour, a former brand of flour sold in Canada produced by the maker of Robin Hood Flour
Radium Line, a marine transportation company operating out of Port Radium, NWT, Canada
Radium weed, Euphorbia peplus, also known as Petty Spurge
Radium Lavans, a fictional character from Zone of the Enders

See also

 Ra (disambiguation)
 Radium Springs (disambiguation)
 Radium Queen (disambiguation)
 Radium Institute (disambiguation)
 Radium Express (disambiguation)